The GEC Stephenson locomotives are a type of heavy industrial shunter built in the 1970s by British industrial company GEC Traction. The locomotives were used for heavy shunting tasks in UK industrial sites for clients including British Steel Corporation and the National Coal Board.

History and design
The locomotives were available in 3- or 4-axle versions in the same frame, with a range of masses and engine powers, each axle was powered and the locomotives could be operated in multiple from a single cab.

Most of the locomotives produced were 3 axle versions of two types - a 50-ton loco (16.5 ton axleload) with a 500 hp V8 cylinder Dorman 8QT engine, and a 75-ton (25 ton axleload) machine with a 12-cylinder engine rated at 750 hp. The NCB acquired both locomotive types.

British Steel acquired the heavier 75 ton model; twenty five 750 hp locomotives were acquired by BSC Redcar primarily for hauling torpedo wagons.

An ex-Barrington Cement Works ex-ICI locomotive named Ludwig Mond was acquired in 2010 by the Rutland Railway Museum.

As of 2012 locomotives of this type are still in service with Tata Steel Europe in the UK. In January 2012 the steel works in Lackenby imported ten 1500 kW ex-NSB Di8 Bo'Bo' locomotives for the torpedo wagon trains - this will result in several of the GEC locomotives being scrapped though some are expected to be retained for track renewal and shunting work.

Notes

References

External links

Images
, Redcar steel, blue livery
, Redcar steel, yellow livery
, NCB blue livery

GEC locomotives
Industrial diesel locomotives of Great Britain
Standard gauge steam locomotives of Great Britain
Railway locomotives introduced in 1976